Where the Fire Burns is a 2012 Turkish drama film directed by İsmail Güneş. The film was selected as the Turkish entry for the Best Foreign Language Oscar at the 85th Academy Awards, but it did not make the final shortlist.

Cast
 Elifcan Ongurlar as Ayse
 Hakan Karahan as Osman
 Yesim Ceren Bozoglu as Hatice
 Serhan Süsler as Demir
 Abdullah Sekeroglu as Hüseyin
 Ozan Göksu Sayin as Seyit
 Dean Baykan as Denis
 Özlem Balci as Asiye
 Katharina Weithaler as Stefanie
 Oguzhan Sekeroglu as Ali
 Utku Sahin as Kenan

See also
 List of submissions to the 85th Academy Awards for Best Foreign Language Film
 List of Turkish submissions for the Academy Award for Best Foreign Language Film

References

External links
 

2012 films
2012 drama films
Turkish drama films
2010s Turkish-language films